Frederik de Winne (born 28 May 1985 in Ghent) is a Belgian footballer who plays as a right back for KVC Jong Lede. His prior clubs included Belgian Pro League team Lokeren and Belgian Second Division team OH Leuven.

Notes

External links
Guardian's Stats Centre

1985 births
Living people
Belgian footballers
K.S.C. Lokeren Oost-Vlaanderen players
Oud-Heverlee Leuven players
Belgian Pro League players
Challenger Pro League players
Association football defenders
People from Dendermonde
Footballers from East Flanders